A tinderbox is a container with the essential tools to make a fire.

Tinderbox may also refer to:

Entertainment 
 Tinderbox (Siouxsie and the Banshees album), a 1986 album by Siouxsie & the Banshees
 Tinderbox (Stiff Little Fingers album), a 1997 album by Stiff Little Fingers
 "Tinder Box" (CSI episode), an episode of CSI: Miami
 "Tinderbox", a song by Acoustic Alchemy from the 2003 album Radio Contact
 "Tinderbox", a song by Elton John from the 2006 album The Captain & the Kid
 "The Tinderbox", a 1835 Danish fairy tale written by Hans Christian Andersen
 The Tinderbox (1946 film), Danish animated film of the story
 The Tinder Box (film), 1959 East German film of the story
 The Tinderbox, musical duo formed by Steve Ashley and Dave Menday

Other uses 
 Tinderbox (application software), a personal content management tool developed by Eastgate Systems
 Tinderbox, Tasmania, Australia
 The Tinder Box, a chain of tobacco stores founded in Santa Monica, California in 1928

See also 
 Patch box (disambiguation)